{{Infobox television
| image =
| caption =
| picture_format = 16:9 (2003, 2004,  2005 & 2006)
| runtime = 25 mins
| creator =
| narrated = Jonathan Kydd
| channel = ITV London
| first_aired = 
| last_aired = 
| num_series = 3
| num_episodes = 21
| producer = Mosaic Films
| related = Disappearing LondonHow London Was Built
}}The Tube'' is a British television programme shown on ITV London and certain BSkyB television channels including Sky Real Lives and Sky3.

It is a documentary/docusoap about the London Underground network, and follows London Underground workers—drivers, station staff, managers, and so forth—showing the Underground system to the public through their eyes.

The programme was produced by Mosaic Films first for Carlton Television, and later for ITV London and Sky Travel.
To date, there have been three series produced, including a two-part special on the 7 July 2005 London bombings. The series is now sometimes repeated, mostly on Pick TV.

Episodes

Series One

Series One Special

Series Two

Series Three

Series Three Special

DVD release
Due to the popularity of the series, Two DVD sets were released in 2007. Series One and Two were available as one double set; While Series Three was released as a single set. Special features include train footage and photographs.

External links
 

2003 British television series debuts
2006 British television series endings
ITV documentaries
English-language television shows
Carlton Television
Television series by ITV Studios
Television shows set in London